The 1981 Australian Sports Sedan Championship was an Australian motor racing competition for Group B Sports Sedans.
It was sanctioned by the Confederation of Australian Motor Sport and was the sixth Australian Sports Sedan Championship.

Reigning champion Tony Edmonson, won his second consequtive title in the Don Elliot-owned Alfa Romeo Alfetta GTV, this time fitted with an ex-Formula 5000 5.0L Chevrolet V8 engine instead of the Repco Holden V8 used in 1980. His closest competition came from the 6.0 litre Chevrolet Monza of Adelaide's John Briggs, who finished second, with Sydney's Phil Ward third in his Penthouse sponsored Holden Monaro HQ. Both the Alfa Romeo and the Chevrolet were built by Adelaide-based K&A Engineering.

The championship was the last for Australian driver / businessman Bob Jane, who drove his Pat Purcell-built Chevrolet Monza to equal ninth in the series. Jane, who had won the Bathurst 500 on four occasions in the 1960s and had also won four Australian Touring Car Championships, retired from driving at the end of 1981 due to an ongoing back injury.

The Sports Sedan Championship was discontinued with the introduction of the Australian GT Championship in 1982. Some Sports Sedans were converted to GT specifications and others competed in the new championship with the GT cars. The GT Championship itself lasted only until 1985 before also being disbanded. Although there would be minor Sports Sedan series contested in various Australian states, the Australian Sports Sedan Championship itself would not return to the Australian calendar until 1991.

Calendar

The championship was contested over eleven rounds.

Points
Championship points were awarded on a 9–6–4–3–2–1 basis to the top six placegetters in each round.
Only the best nine round performances were counted towards each driver's championship total.
For rounds run over two heats, round points were awarded on a 20–16–13–11–10–9–8–7–6–5–4–3–2–1 basis to the top 14 placegetters in each heat.
The six drivers attaining the highest aggregate from the two heats were then awarded the championship points for that round.
If more than one driver attained the same total, the relevant round placing was awarded to the driver who achieved the higher placing in the second heat.

Results

 Note: The top six results in the above table are based on those published in Australian Motor Racing Year, 1981, Page 164 however additional positions below the top six have been calculated from results for Rounds 1 through 10 in the same publication and results for the final round in Racing Car News, November 1981, page 35.

References

Further reading
 Racing Car News, January 1982, page 38
 Souvenir Programme, Adelaide International Raceway, Sunday 25 October 1981

External links
 Records,Titles and Awards at www.camsmanual.com.au 
 Autopics images including 1981 Australian Sports Sedan Championship

Sports Sedan Championship
National Sports Sedan Series